Emilio Ramos (born 25 April 1935) is a Spanish archer. He competed in the men's individual event at the 1972 Summer Olympics.

References

1935 births
Living people
Spanish male archers
Olympic archers of Spain
Archers at the 1972 Summer Olympics
Place of birth missing (living people)